Mindaugas Sadauskas (born 14 June 1990) is a Lithuanian swimmer who specialized in sprint freestyle events. He is a multiple-time Lithuanian champion, who represented his country at the FINA World Championships, LEN European Championships and other international competition. Sadauskas also represented Lithuania at the London Olympic Games in 2012. He has seven national level records at the moment. Sadauskas is also a member of the swimming team for SMU Mustangs at the Southern Methodist University in Dallas, Texas. Sadauskas achieved multiple gold medals at the Conference USA while studying at the SMU.

Personal life 
Sadauskas was born in Panevezys, Lithuania, the son of Laima and Vygantas. He attended Panevezio Zemynos secondary school and represented his swim school all over the world. He graduated from high school in 2009. Sadauskas represented the Southern Methodist University and SMU Mustangs for four years with remarkable achievements. He received a Bachelor of Art degree from Southern Methodist University in 2014. After receiving a bachelor's degree, Sadauskas moved to Plymouth, England, where he extended his swimming skills and also received a Masters of Science degree in International Logistics and Chain Supply Management in 2016. His swimming career started when he qualified for the European Youth Olympic Festival in 2005. In 2018 Sadauskas married Bulgarian Olympic swimmer Nina Rangelova.

Career

2009 
In 2009, Sadauskas won his first ever individual title at the Conference USA Championships in Houston, Texas, posting a time of 0:44:18 sec. in the 100 yard Freestyle event.

At the 2009 FINA World Championships in Rome, Italy, Sadauskas represented Lithuania and placed 36th in the 100 m Freestyle event. He posted his new personal best time 0:49:26 sec. in the preliminary heats. However, he missed the semifinals by less than a second. Besides that, Sadauskas set an individual-split time of 48.90 seconds, and a national record of 3:16.47, along with his teammates Vytautas Janušaitis, Paulius Viktoravičius, and Mindaugas Margis, in the men's 400 m freestyle relay at the 2009 FINA World Championships in Rome, Italy. He also competed in the 50 m Freestyle event.

2010-2011 
In 2010, Sadauskas took four gold medals in the individual events at the Conference USA Championships in Houston, Texas. He posted a time of 0:43:03 sec. in the 100yard Freestyle that qualified for NCAA Championship.

At the 2011 FINA World Championships in Shanghai, China, Sadauskas placed 29th in the 100 m Freestyle event with the time 0:49:66 sec. He also competed in the 50 m Freestyle and placed 34th place. Sadauskas in both events failed to advance into the semifinals.

Sadauskas represented Lithuania and Southern Methodist University at the XXVI Universiade Games in Shenzhen, China. He posted a time of 0:50:14 sec. and took 8th place in the final of the 100m. Freestyle event.

2012 Summer Olympics 
Sadauskas qualified for the men's 100 m freestyle at the 2012 Summer Olympics in London, by breaking a meet record and eclipsing a FINA B-standard entry time of 49.54 seconds from the Open Luxembourg Nationals in Luxembourg City.. At the 2012 Summer Olympics, he challenged seven other Olympians in the fifth heat, including three-time Olympian and UC Berkeley graduate Dominik Meichtry of Switzerland. Sadauskas edged out Meichtry to take a fourth spot by 0.17 of a second, outside his entry time of 49.78 seconds. Sadauskas failed to advance into the semifinals, as he placed twenty-eighth overall in the preliminaries.

Besides that, Sadauskas competed at the FINA World Short Course Championship in Istanbul, Turkey. He qualified for the 100 m Freestyle semifinals with a time of 0:47:82 sec. However, he failed to advance to the final and placed 16th place.

2013-2014 
In 2013, Sadauskas swam the second fastest time in the 100 m Freestyle in SMU Mustangs history at the Conference USA Houston, Texas with a time of 0:42.77 sec. and qualified for the NCAA Championship.

Sadauskas also raced at the Arena Grand Prix Mesa, Arizona where he finished 4th in the 100 m Freestyle with a time of 0:49:78 sec. Sadauskas was left behind by an Olympian champion Nathan Adrian,  Richard Berens and another Olympian Darian Townsend.

In the summer of 2013, Sadauskas competed at the XXVII Universiade Games in Kazan, Russia. During his performances, he qualified to the semifinals in the 50 m Freestyle and ended up in the 14th place with a time of 0:23:02 sec.

At the 2013 FINA World Championships in Barcelona, Spain, Sadauskas participated in the 50m. and 100 m. Freestyle events. However, he failed to advance to the finals. Besides that, Sadauskas and his teammates Danas Rapsys, Giedrius Titenis and Tadas Duskinas participated in the 400 Medley Relay were they placed in 13th place with a new national record of 3:36:72. Sadauskas also set an individual-split time of 0:48:76seconds.

At the 2013 LEN European Short Course Championship in Herning, Denmark, Sadauskas and his teammates Danas Rapsys, Giedrius Titenis and Tadas Duskinas were 4th in the 200Medley Relay with a time of 1:35:26sec. which was also a new national record.

At the 2014 LEN European Long Course Championship  in Berlin, Germany, Sadauskas placed two 7th places along with his teammates Danas Rapsys, Giedrius Titenis and Tadas Duskinas in the 400Medley Relay and 400Freestyle Relay with the times of 3:36:18 and 3:19:91seconds.

In 2014, FINA 12th World Short Course Championships in Doha, Qatar, was another competition were Sadauskas placed 7th and 11th places. In the 200Medley Relay with a time of 1:34:35sec, which was also a new national record and 400Medley Relay with a time of 3:28:76 seconds.

2015 season 
Sadauskas competed at the International de Canet-en-Roussillon Meet, Canet-En-Rousillon, France, where he was 8th in the 100 m Freestyle event with a time of 0:49:54 seconds.

At the 52nd. Sette Colli International Trophy Meet in Rome, Italy, Sadauskas participated in the 100 m Freestyle event and was 6th with a time of 0:49:68 seconds and in the 50 m Freestyle event Sadauskas was 8th with a time of 0:22:54 seconds.

At the FINA 16th World Championship in Kazan, Russia, Sadauskas and his Lithuanian teammates Danas Rapsys, Giedrius Titenis and Tadas Duskinas made 2016 Summer Olympics qualification standard. Sadauskas was part of the 400Medley Relay which was 12th overall and qualified for the Rio 2008 Summer Olympics.

At the 2015 LEN European Championship in Netanya, Israel, Sadauskas surprised Lithuania and the world with a new Lithuanian national record in the 100 m Freestyle event, which was 21-years-old. Overall, Sadauskas placed 7th with a time of 0:47:18 seconds.

Personal best times

References

External links
 
 
 
 
 

1990 births
Living people
Lithuanian male freestyle swimmers
Olympic swimmers of Lithuania
Swimmers at the 2012 Summer Olympics
Sportspeople from Panevėžys
SMU Mustangs men's swimmers